Alyaksandr Yawhenavich Chysty (Aleksandr Yevgenyevich Chisty; born 14 January 1972 in Minsk) is a former Belarusian football player.

References

1972 births
Footballers from Minsk
Living people
Belarusian footballers
FC Fandok Bobruisk players
FC Shakhtyor Soligorsk players
FC Lokomotiv Nizhny Novgorod players
Russian Premier League players
Belarusian expatriate footballers
Expatriate footballers in Russia
FC Amkar Perm players
Association football goalkeepers
FC Viktoryja Marjina Horka players
FC Novokuznetsk players